The Amizade Bridge is a four-lane, two-way bridge in Macau that connects Macau Peninsula near the Reservatório and Taipa Island at Pac On.

Built after the Macau–Taipa Bridge, it is the second one that connects the peninsula and Taipa across the Zhujiang River Estuary. Thus it is also referred to as the New Macau–Taipa Bridge.

Construction started in June 1990. There are two crests on the bridge to allow for the passage of sea traffic. The two entrances on the peninsula are at Avenida de Amizada near the Hong Kong–Macau Ferry Terminal and at Avenida da Ponte da Amizade in Areia Preta. The two entrances on the northern slope of Taipa Grande are at Estrada de Pac On, that connects to Pac On, and at Estrada Almirante Magalhães Correia, that connects with the Centro of Taipa (Vila da Taipa).

See also
 Transport in Macau

External links

Bridges completed in 1994
Bridges in Macau
1994 establishments in Macau